Cortés was a planned, but never made, American historical drama streaming television miniseries created and written by Steven Zaillian and starring Javier Bardem. The series was set to premiere on Amazon Prime Video before the COVID-19 pandemic hit, but was ultimately canceled in late 2020 before production resumed.

Premise
The four-episode series was to follow "the legendary conqueror, Hernán Cortés, who led a rebellious expedition to the heart of King Moctezuma II’s Aztec Empire, connecting two civilizations for the first time and changing the course of history."

Cast and characters
 Javier Bardem as Hernán Cortés
 Tenoch Huerta as Moctezuma II
 Yoshira Escárrega as Malintzin / Marina
 Gregory Zaragoza as Tlenamacac

Production

Development
In 1965, screenwriter Dalton Trumbo finished a 205-page draft of a screenplay entitled Montezuma, with a story centered around the complicated relationship between Spanish conquistador Hernán Cortés and Aztec leader Moctezuma II. The film was written with intent of having Martin Ritt direct and Kirk Douglas play the role of Cortés. The production ultimately never came together.

In 2014, it was reported that Steven Spielberg was considering directing Montezuma from a screenplay written by Steven Zaillian based on the original script by Trumbo. It was further reported that the film might be retitled Cortes as the new screenplay featured him as the main character.

On March 26, 2018, it was announced that the project had been redeveloped from a film into a television miniseries and that Amazon had given it an order for four episodes. The series was created and written by Steven Zaillian who is also set to executive produce alongside Spielberg, Darryl Frank, Justin Falvey, and Javier Bardem. On October 3, 2019, it was reported that Ciro Guerra and Cristina Gallegos would direct the miniseries, while Gael García Bernal and Diego Luna would executive produce.

The series was to be filmed in Spanish, Nahuatl and Chontal Mayan, from scripts translated by David Bowles. However, in September 2020, Amazon decided to withdraw from its partnership with Amblin on the miniseries, effectively scrapping the project due to complications from the COVID-19 pandemic.

Casting
Alongside the initial series announcement, it was confirmed that Javier Bardem, who was initially attached to the project when it was a feature film, had been cast in the lead role of Hernán Cortés. In February 2020, it was further announced that Tenoch Huerta will play Moctezuma II, Aztec Emperor, while Yoshira Escárrega takes on the role of Malintzin or Marina, the strategic partner, translator and consort of Hernán Cortés.
Ammar Aldieri was to play the role of Tapeia. However, the project never got off the ground.

References

External links

Spanish-language television shows
Amazon Prime Video original programming
Television series by Amblin Entertainment
Television shows based on American novels
Television series set in the Pre-Columbian era
Unaired television shows
Television productions cancelled due to the COVID-19 pandemic
Works by Steven Zaillian